Leopold Willem Ras (1760s–1823) was a Dutch merchant-trader and diplomat.

Life
In June 1785, Ras sailed from  near his hometown as a ship's boy on board the Alblasserdam to work in East Asia with the Dutch East Indies Company (or Verenigde Oost-Indische Compagnie or VOC in Dutch). His father had apparently died before his departure, and until 1805 Ras sent payments home to his mother, Magdalena Elisabeth Putkamer.

Before 1798, Ras was sent to Japan as a records keeper/bookkeeper or warehouseman. At this point in Japanese history, the sole VOC outpost (or "factory") was situated on Dejima island in the harbor of Nagasaki on the southern island of Kyushu.

Ras became acting Opperhoofd or chief negotiant and officer of the VOC trading post.   His role had to change after the death of Dejima's chief official, Gijsbert Hemmij.  In 1798, Hemmij died at Kanegawa near Edo during the return journey to Nagasaki after a formal audience at the shogun's court in Edo.

The difficulties Ras confronted were exacerbated by a fire which destroyed the VOC warehouse and other structures on Dejima.

Ras resigned from his post on 30 June 1800. He married Christina Abigael Versteegh, with whom he had two daughters  before 1815 on Banda Neira in the Moluccas. Ras died there 4 March 1823.

See also
 VOC Opperhoofden in Japan
 William Robert Stewart

Notes

References
 Gourlay, Walter E. (2008).  "A Camel for the Shogun: William Robert Stewart and the Deshima Connection" (abstract; paper). ASPAC 2008.  Centre for Asia-Pacific Initiatives, University of Victoria University of Victoria, British Columbia
 {{nihongo|Historiographical Institute, the University of Tokyo|東京大学史料編纂所|Tokyo daigaku shiryō hensan-jo}}. (1963). Historical documents relating to Japan in foreign countries: an inventory of microfilm acquisitions in the library of the Historiographical Institute, the University of Tokyo.  
 Janetta, Ann Bowman. (2007). The Vaccinators: Smallpox, Medical Knowledge, and the "Opening" of Japan. Stanford: Stanford University Press. ; 
 Vialle, Cynthia and Ton Vermeulen. (1997). The Deshima Dagregisters: Their Original Tables of Contents, Vol. 10,  1790-1800.'' Leiden: Institute for the History of European Expansion.

External links
 De VOC site:  Dejima history, opperhoofden 

1760s births 
1823 deaths
Dutch chiefs of factory in Japan
Dutch expatriates in Japan
Businesspeople from Antwerp